Tom Borton (January 4, 1956 – July 26, 2011) was an American saxophonist and composer, and was the founder and CEO of Los Angeles Post Music, Inc.

Biography
Borton was born in Norristown, Pennsylvania to Robert G. and Phyllis M. (Phelps) Borton, and  began playing saxophone at age 7. Borton later on moved to Indiana, and attended Eastwood Junior High School, where he was a member of the school band. He won a talent show at a summer music camp held by Purdue University when he was in 8th grade. While in high school, he played with Tarnished Silver, a band which featured R&B singer and songwriter Kenneth Edmonds, best known as Babyface. Borton graduated from North Central High School in Indianapolis, Indiana in 1974, and attended Indiana University Blooming School of Music, where he joined a band called Streamwinner, which featured drummer Kenny Aronoff.

In 1981, Borton moved to Los Angeles, California, and joined The Big Picture band in 1987, where he played alto saxophone. In 1990, he signed with the Mesa/Bluemoon Recordings label, and released his debut album Dancing With Tigers, which was co-produced with jazz musician Vel Lewis. Two of the songs from the album, "Wherever You Are" and "Looking for a Way", were both played during the Local Forecast on the Weather Channel. In 1992, Borton released his second album The Lost World, which also featured Lewis, and co-produced Steve Allee's The Magic Hour album, which was released in 1995. Borton was also the founder and CEO of Los Angeles Post Music, Inc, a production music library, where he composed music for the 1998 TV documentary Titantic: Secrets Revealed, and movies such as The Jitters (1989), and Amy's Orgasm (2001).

Borton died unexpectedly at his home in Los Angeles on July 26, 2011, at the age of 55. His third and final album Simply One was released posthumously in 2012.

Discography
1990: Dancing With Tigers (Mesa/Bluemoon Recordings)
1992: The Lost World (Mesa/Bluemoon Recordings)
2012: Simply One

References

External Links
Tom Borton at AllMusic
Tom Borton at IMDB

1956 births
2011 deaths
American saxophonists
Musicians from Indiana